Thomas County is a county in the U.S. state of Nebraska. As of the 2010 United States Census, the population was 647. Its county seat is Thedford. The county was formed in 1887, and was named for General George H. Thomas.

In the Nebraska license plate system, Thomas County is represented by the prefix 89 (it had the eighty-ninth-largest number of vehicles registered in the county when the license plate system was established in 1922).

Geography

The terrain of Thomas County consists of rolling hills, sloping to the east. The Middle Loup River flows east-southeastward through the middle of the county, and the Dismal River flows in the same direction through the lower part of the county. The two streams converge east of Thomas County.

Major highways
  U.S. Highway 83
  Nebraska Highway 2

Adjacent counties

 Cherry County - north
 Blaine County - east
 Logan County - south
 McPherson County - southwest
 Hooker County - west

National protected area
 Nebraska National Forest (part)

Demographics

As of the 2000 United States Census, there were 729 people, 325 households, and 216 families in the county. The population density was 1 person per square mile (0.4/km2). There were 446 housing units at an average density of 0.6 per square mile (0.2/km2). The racial makeup of the county was 99.45% White, 0.27% Native American, and 0.27% from two or more races. 0.82% of the population were Hispanic or Latino of any race.

There were 325 households, out of which 26.80% had children under the age of 18 living with them, 60.60% were married couples living together, 4.30% had a female householder with no husband present, and 33.50% were non-families. 31.40% of all households were made up of individuals, and 16.60% had someone living alone who was 65 years of age or older. The average household size was 2.24 and the average family size was 2.84.

The county population contained 23.60% under the age of 18, 4.40% from 18 to 24, 23.90% from 25 to 44, 27.80% from 45 to 64, and 20.30% who were 65 years of age or older. The median age was 44 years. For every 100 females there were 99.70 males. For every 100 females age 18 and over, there were 90.80 males.

The median income for a household in the county was $27,292, and the median income for a family was $36,618. Males had a median income of $25,662 versus $20,577 for females. The per capita income for the county was $15,335. About 13.60% of families and 14.30% of the population were below the poverty line, including 21.30% of those under age 18 and 17.30% of those age 65 or over.

Communities

Villages
 Halsey (partial)
 Thedford (county seat)

Census-designated place 

 Seneca

Unincorporated places
 Natick
 Norway

Politics
Thomas County voters are reliably Republican. In no national election since 1936 has the county selected the Democratic Party candidate. 

Thomas county is the only county outside of the confederacy and border south to vote for both Democrat John Davis is in his landslide loss as well as Republican Barry Goldwater in his, 40 years later.

See also
 National Register of Historic Places listings in Thomas County, Nebraska

References

 
1887 establishments in Nebraska
Populated places established in 1887